Bakshi Abdur Rashid (1 January 1923 – August 1977) was an Indian politician who was a member of the 2nd Lok Sabha & 3rd Lok Sabha of India. He represented the Srinagar constituency of Jammu & Kashmir and was a member of the Congress (I) political party.

In the 3rd Lok Sabha, he was a Lok Sabha candidate, nominated by the President of India.

Education and background
Rashid was educated at Church Mission Educational Institution, Srinagar.

Posts held

See also
List of members of the 15th Lok Sabha of India

References 

India MPs 1957–1962
India MPs 1962–1967
1923 births
People from Srinagar
Lok Sabha members from Jammu and Kashmir
1977 deaths
Nominated members of the Lok Sabha
Indian National Congress politicians